Degressive proportionality is an approach to the allocation (between regions, states or other subdivisions) of seats in a legislature or other decision-making body. Degressive proportionality means that while the subdivisions do not each elect an equal number of members, smaller subdivisions are allocated more seats than would be allocated strictly in proportion to their population.

This is an alternative to, for instance,

 Each subdivision electing the same number of members (as in the US Senate),
 Each subdivision electing a number of members strictly proportional to its population (as in the US House of Representatives).

Degressive proportionality is intermediate between those two approaches. As a term it does not describe any one particular formula.

Uses

Germany 
Each German state has three to six seats in the Bundesrat of Germany depending on its population. This means the least populous state, Bremen (with 663,000 inhabitants), has three seats while the most populous one, North Rhine-Westphalia (with 18,058,000 inhabitants), has only six seats.

European Parliament 

Under the Treaty of Lisbon, the European Parliament uses a system of degressive proportionality to allocate its 750 seats among the member states of the European Union. Treaty negotiations, rather than a specific formula, determine the apportionment between member states.

Minimum seats 

Any system that reserves a minimum number of seats for a sub-body is to some extent degressively proportional. One example is the election of the US presidential Electoral College. As each state has a minimum of three members of the college, voters in smaller states have disproportionally more say in the election than the national average.
Like the US Electoral College, Spain's Congress of Deputies adds two extra seats to the otherwise proportional number allocated to each province.

Advantages 
 There may be a real or perceived concern that one or more of the largest subdivisions will dominate the legislature. That concern reduces if the votes of these subdivisions are reduced.
 The smallest subdivisions, especially those on the periphery of the territory, may have significantly different interests from many of the other subdivisions. These interests could be ignored if they have a tiny number of representatives. That concern is reduced if their representation is increased.
 More pragmatically, the smallest subdivisions may be in a position to cause disproportionate trouble for the whole territory, for example by threatening to secede. That concern is reduced if they are seen to be well-represented in the legislature.

Disadvantages
 
 Many of the advantages listed above would also apply to certain smaller areas that are not recognised as separate subdivisions for electoral purposes. (It may have happened as an accident of history or as a result of gerrymandering.) It is unfair if they are not accorded the same treatment as areas that are recognised electorally as separate subdivisions.

Methods for allocating weights 
 Penrose method (square root of the population)

Voting